The 1947 Cleveland Browns season was the team's second in the All-America Football Conference (AAFC). Coached by Paul Brown, Cleveland finished with a 12–1–1 win–loss–tie record, winning the western division and the AAFC championship for the second straight year. As in 1946, quarterback Otto Graham led an offensive attack that featured fullback Marion Motley and ends Dante Lavelli and Mac Speedie.

After a number of coaching changes and roster moves in the offseason, including signing punter Horace Gillom and fullback Tony Adamle, the Browns began with a 30–14 win over the Buffalo Bills, the first of a string of five victories. The team lost its only game of the season to the Los Angeles Dons in October. Five more wins followed before a come-from-behind tie in November with the New York Yankees, the team Cleveland defeated in the 1946 AAFC championship. The Browns won their last two games, including a 42–0 shutout against the Baltimore Colts in the finale, to set up a championship game rematch with the Yankees in December. Cleveland beat the Yankees 14–3 in New York on an icy field to win its second championship in a row.

Graham was named the AAFC's most valuable player after leading the league in passing yards, with 2,753, and passing touchdowns, with 25. Speedie led the league in receiving, and several other Cleveland players were named to sportswriters' All-Pro lists. Brown was named the league's coach of the year by Pro Football Illustrated. The Browns played all their home games in Cleveland Stadium, attracting an average crowd of 55,848, the best home attendance record in both the AAFC and the competing National Football League (NFL).

Offseason and roster moves

Cleveland finished with a 12–2 regular-season record and won the All-America Football Conference (AAFC) championship in 1946, the league's first year of play. Despite the team's strength, however, head coach Paul Brown made a number of roster moves before the beginning of 1947. He signed Tony Adamle, a fullback and linebacker who joined the team even though he had two years of college eligibility left at Ohio State University, and guard Bob Gaudio, another Ohio State player. Guard Weldon Humble, who Brown recruited out of Rice University in Texas, also joined the team.

In the Browns' biggest trade of the offseason, Brown sent end John Harrington to the Chicago Rockets for Bill Boedeker, a halfback. Perhaps the most significant signing, however, was punter Horace Gillom, who had played for Brown at Massillon Washington High School and who Brown had recruited to Ohio State before World War II. Gillom could kick the ball further than most punters of his era. He changed the way teams approached punting by lining up 15 yards behind the center instead of the customary 10 yards to give himself more space and time to make his kicks. Gillom was also the third black player to sign with the Browns at a time when many teams did not employ African-Americans. Cleveland chose fullback Dick Hoerner in the 1947 AAFC Draft, but he signed instead with the Los Angeles Rams of the National Football League.

The Browns also made a number of changes to the coaching staff before the season. Bob Voigts, the tackles coach in 1946, left to become head football coach at Northwestern University. Bill Edwards, a former schoolmate of Brown's at Massillon, was hired to replace him. Red Conkright, the end and center coach in 1946, left for an assistant coaching job with the Buffalo Bills; he was replaced by Dick Gallagher. Creighton Miller, meanwhile, who had served as a backfield coach, left the Browns staff to get a law degree.

Roster and coaching staff

Preseason

Source: Cleveland Plain Dealer
    
    
    
    

Cleveland held its training camp at Bowling Green University, as it did the year before. The Browns played one preseason game in late August against the Baltimore Colts, a new AAFC team formed to replace the Miami Seahawks after the Seahawks folded. The Browns scored their first points on a drive in the second period. A 14-yard run by fullback Marion Motley set up a 25-yard touchdown throw by quarterback Otto Graham to end Mac Speedie. Cleveland scored three more touchdowns in the game, all of them following Colts passes the Browns intercepted. One of them was a pass by Graham to end Dante Lavelli in the third quarter, and another was a rush by halfback Edgar Jones. Paul Brown pulled most of the Browns' starters from the game as the team built up a three-touchdown lead. Backup end Bob Cowan scored a fourth Cleveland touchdown in the final quarter on a pass from backup quarterback Ermal Allen, and the Browns won 28–0. Following the victory, the Browns faced the Buffalo Bills in the regular-season opener at Cleveland Stadium to begin their defense of the AAFC championship.

Regular season results

Game summaries

Week 1: vs. Buffalo Bills

Source: Pro Football Reference
    
    
    
    
    
    
    

Cleveland began the season with a 30–14 win over the Buffalo Bills. The Browns got out to a fast start, scoring two touchdowns in the first quarter and adding two more in the second while holding the Bills scoreless. Buffalo came back in the third quarter, scoring two touchdowns of its own, but Cleveland held its lead. Browns coach Paul Brown criticized the performance after the game, saying the team had failed to keep pace in the second half after he rotated in some of his younger players. "We got a good head of steam and took a commanding lead in the first half and then let down and looked bad in the last two periods," he said. Buffalo quarterback George Ratterman felt pressure from Cleveland's defense the whole game, and said the Browns were better than the Chicago Bears, who had won the 1946 NFL Championship Game the previous season. "Their line rushed me all night long and I didn't have much of a chance to get the ball away accurately," Ratterman said. "I think the Browns are much better than the Bears, especially their line." Placekicker Lou Groza had his extra point blocked after the Browns' first touchdown. It was his first missed extra point since Cleveland started play in 1946.

Week 2: vs. Brooklyn Dodgers

Source: Pro Football Reference
    
    
    
    
    
    
    
    
    

Cleveland next faced the Brooklyn Dodgers, winning 55–7. The Browns scored three touchdowns in five minutes during the first quarter. Cleveland added five more touchdowns in the second half and held a comfortable lead to the end. Fullback Marion Motley ran for 111 yards on five carries and scored two touchdowns, including a 50-yard run at the beginning of the second half. Tommy Colella scored a touchdown on an 82-yard punt return, and Bill Lund ran back an interception 28 yards for another. It was in this game that the Draw play was accidentally invented when Otto Graham tripped while dropping back for a pass. As he went down, sensing blitzers about to wallop him, he stuck the ball in Motley's stomach who scampered for a sizable gain. Liking the effect, Brown added it to the playbook during halftime. By the next game the play became a staple of the offense with several versions for different situations. As Cleveland's lead increased in the second half, Brown put in second-string players. Quarterback Otto Graham was replaced by Ermal Allen, who threw for two of the Browns' touchdowns and intercepted a pass while playing on defense. Cliff Lewis, Graham's primary backup, also played in the game. Brooklyn's only score came in the second quarter on a Bob Hoernschemeyer rush. The Dodgers were hurt by short punts from Mickey Colmer and a poor passing game. The team was held to 39 yards of passing. Edgar Jones, Cleveland's primary halfback suffered an elbow injury during the game.

Week 3: vs. Baltimore Colts

Source: Pro Football Reference
    
    
    
    

Cleveland shut out the Colts 28–0 in the third game of the regular season. The team scored three of its four touchdowns in the first quarter in a span of 12 plays. Two of those touchdowns came on runs, one by Motley and the other by Bill Boedeker; the third was a Colella interception returned for a score. The Browns' fourth touchdown, a short run by Bob Cowan, came at the end of the second quarter. Cleveland was helped by strong punting from Horace Gillom, who had a 55.7-yard average for the game, including punts of 85 and 80 yards. Graham was taken out of the game in the first half along with most of the team's first-string players. Bud Schwenk substituted at quarterback later in the game, but the team did not score in the second half. Baltimore had two opportunities to score, once reaching the Browns' four-yard line, but the Cleveland defense held. The victory made the Browns the only undefeated team in the AAFC after the San Francisco 49ers lost to the New York Yankees

Week 4: vs. Chicago Rockets

Source: Pro Football Reference
    
    
    
    
    
    
    
    
    
    

Cleveland beat the Chicago Rockets 41–21 at Chicago's Soldier Field to extend the team's winning streak to four games. The Browns scored a touchdown in the first quarter and two more in the second. The team led 27–0 at the half. Chicago, however, started to come back in the third quarter after Cleveland coach Paul Brown took out most of his first-string players. Graham, Colella, Lew Mayne and Ed Ulinski sat out most of the game. Chicago quarterback Sam Vacanti threw three touchdown passes in the second half to give the Rockets 21 points, but a score by Cleveland's Boedeker and a fumble return for a touchdown by Spiro Dellerba kept the game out of reach. The Rockets' Bill Kellagher intercepted one of Graham's passes in the first quarter, ending Graham's streak of 91 straight pass attempts without an interception, a professional football record at the time. Chicago had the best passing performance against the Browns of any team the Browns had faced in 1947 as Vacanti threw for 195 yards on 11 completions. Groza kicked through two field goals and five extra points in the game, putting him in third place in scoring in the AAFC behind Motley and New York's Spec Sanders. Motley suffered a head injury during a pileup in the second quarter and was taken to the locker room.

Week 5: vs. New York Yankees

Source: Pro Football Reference
    
    
    
    
    
    
    
    

Cleveland next faced the Yankees at home in a rematch of the previous year's title game. The crowd of 80,067 was the second-largest in professional football history at the time. More people were turned away at the gates because Cleveland Stadium was filled to capacity. New York scored first in the first quarter on a 47-yard field goal by Harvey Johnson, but Cleveland came back in the second quarter, putting up 17 points to lead 17–3 at halftime. New York came back and tied the game 17–17 in the third quarter. Graham responded with a touchdown throw to Speedie in the third quarter. The Yankees threatened a comeback in the final minutes when Lou Sossman blocked a Groza field goal try and New York recovered, advancing the ball to Cleveland's 25-yard line. Cleveland, however, took over on downs and ran down the clock to three minutes with a series of running plays, reaching New York's 35-yard line. Groza then attempted a field goal that fell short, but the Yankees were called offside, and Groza successfully booted his next try through, giving Cleveland a 26–17 victory. The Browns had 14 first downs to New York's 11 and rushed for 212 yards, compared to 111 for the Yankees. Graham had 11 completions for 161 passing yards despite being sacked five times for 72 yards of losses.

Week 6: vs. Los Angeles Dons

Source: Pro Football Reference
    
    
    
    
    

Cleveland lost its first game of the season to the Dons, 13–10. The Browns opened the scoring with a Groza field goal in the first quarter followed by a touchdown run from Motley, his sixth of the season, to go up 10–0. Los Angeles, however, scored a touchdown in the second quarter to come within three points of the Browns. Dons kicker Ben Agajanian then kicked field goals in the third and fourth quarters to win the game. The final field goal came in the closing seconds of the game after the Dons reached the Browns' 28-yard line. Agajanian missed on his first attempt, but Cleveland were penalized five yards for having 12 men on the field. Agajanian made his second attempt, giving Los Angeles the victory. Cleveland was hurt by three fumbles that set up scores, including the winning field goal. Lavelli suffered bruises to his ribs during the game, and center Mike Scarry had an ankle injury. The loss put the Browns in a virtual tie with the 49ers at 5–1 – the 49ers had the same record, but with an additional tie.

Week 7: vs. Chicago Rockets

Source: Pro Football Reference
    
    
    
    
    
    
    
    
    

Cleveland rebounded from its first loss of the season with a 31–28 victory over the Rockets. The game started slow; Groza's 21-yard field goal was the only score in the first quarter. The Rockets then went ahead by scoring a touchdown on a long pass from quarterback Vacanti to end Elroy Hirsch. Cleveland, however, piled on the points as Motley ran for a touchdown in the second quarter and Speedie caught a pass from Graham in the third. Jones added two touchdown runs in the fourth quarter, giving Cleveland a 31–14 lead. Chicago almost caught up at the end of the game, scoring two touchdowns, but the Browns held on to win. Cleveland's third-string players were on the field in the closing minutes when Chicago made its final push. Rockets rookie Ray Ramsey had three touchdowns in the game. Graham had 239 passing yards on 10 completions. Speedie caught half of them, gaining 166 yards. His touchdown came after he dropped to the ground to grab a 17-yard pass from Graham. He faked a backward lateral while on the ground, which drew Chicago's defense away from him, and then got up and ran into the end zone.

Week 8: vs. San Francisco 49ers

Source: Pro Football Reference
    
    
    

The Browns next faced the San Francisco 49ers, one of the AAFC's stronger teams. San Francisco's record was 5–1–1; its only loss came in a close game against the Yankees, another top team. The 49ers were built around a group of players including quarterback Frankie Albert, end Alyn Beals and back Norm Standlee. The game was played in a heavy fog at Kezar Stadium before a crowd of more than 54,000 people. Cleveland received the opening kickoff, and Graham drove the team to San Francisco's 7-yard line. Jones, however, fumbled the ball and the 49ers took over. After forcing a punt, Cleveland got the ball back and scored on a pass to Lavelli set up by a Motley run and two completions to Speedie. Cleveland scored another touchdown in the second quarter on a long pass to Speedie, and the Browns were ahead by two touchdowns at the half. San Francisco came back on the first drive of the second half, which was capped by a Standlee run for a touchdown from one yard out. Cleveland came close to scoring again in the fourth quarter, but a fumble by Motley ended the drive. The Browns, however, held on to win 14–7. Speedie was the league's leading receiver by the eighth week, having surpassed Alyn Beals and Lavelli.  He had 10 catches for 141 yards against San Francisco; the 10 receptions in a single game set an AAFC record.

Week 9: vs. Buffalo Bills

Source: Pro Football Reference
    
    
    
    
    

A crowd of 43,167 people was on hand to watch the Browns play the Bills, Buffalo's biggest-ever home attendance figure. Cleveland scored a touchdown in each of the game's four quarters, winning 28–7. The first score followed several completions by Graham that set up a 12-yard touchdown run by Jones. In the second period, Cleveland tied a professional football record when Graham, pinned at his own one-yard line, threw a screen pass to Speedie. Speedie caught the ball and ran for a 99-yard touchdown, setting an AAFC record and tying the National Football League record for longest completed pass. The Browns scored again in the third quarter on a diving catch by Lavelli, who rolled into the end zone, and in the fourth quarter on a pass to John Yonakor. Buffalo scored its only points in the fourth period when George Ratterman connected with Al Baldwin for the quarterback's 16th touchdown of the season. Graham threw 13 completions for 246 yards as passing accounted for most of the team's 392 yards of total offense. Cleveland's defense was also strong, preventing the Bills from scoring on several drives that ventured deep into Browns territory. The win was the eighth for Cleveland in nine games and preserved its spot at the top of the AAFC standings.

Week 10: vs. Brooklyn Dodgers

Source: Pro Football Reference
    
    
    
    

The Browns were expected to win their November 9 game against the Brooklyn Dodgers by a wide margin; the Dodgers had just one win, and the Browns scored eight touchdowns when the teams played in September. The Dodgers, however, drove 80 yards on their first possession for a touchdown. Placekicker Phil Martinovich missed the extra point. Cleveland responded as Graham passed to Lavelli for a 72-yard touchdown on the second play from scrimmage on its ensuing possession. Groza kicked through the extra point to give the Browns a 7–6 lead. Cleveland scored again on its next possession, this time a 15-yard pass from Graham to Lew Mayne. After the second touchdown, Graham threw two interceptions and the Browns did not advance the ball past the Brooklyn 42-yard line. The Dodgers, meanwhile, threatened to score numerous times, advancing deep into Cleveland territory. One Brooklyn touchdown by Bob Hoernschmeyer was called back because of a holding penalty. Martinovich contributed to the frustration by missing four field goal tries. He also missed the extra point when the Dodgers did score in the fourth quarter on a long Monk Gafford rush. The Dodgers' missteps gave the Browns a 13–12 victory, extending their lead over the 49ers for the best record in the AAFC after San Francisco lost to the Yankees.

Week 11: vs. San Francisco 49ers

Source: Pro Football Reference
    
    
    
    
    
    
    
    

Cleveland next faced San Francisco at home, winning 37–14 before one of the biggest crowds of the season. Chet Adams opened the scoring for the Browns with a 44-yard field goal; he and Lou Saban shared kicking duties in the game after Groza pulled his leg muscle during pre-game warmups. On the ensuing possession, Albert had the ball stripped by Cleveland's Weldon Humble, and the Browns took over and scored their first touchdown on a Graham pass to Lavelli. San Francisco scored a touchdown near the beginning of the second quarter, but Cleveland dominated the scoring thereafter. Lavelli caught seven passes for a total of three touchdowns, setting an AAFC single-game record. Graham also rushed for a one-yard touchdown and threw for 222 yards. His touchdown passes made him the league leader in that category, with 18 on the season. It was the biggest margin of victory the Browns had ever recorded against the 49ers. Cleveland was helped by an adjustment Paul Brown made in his receivers' routes; the coach had Lavelli and Speedie run toward the middle of the field instead of trying to get open near the sidelines, as they had done in past games. The victory clinched the AAFC's western division for the Browns and assured the team a spot in the championship game.

Week 12: vs. New York Yankees

Source: Pro Football Reference
    
    
    
    
    
    
    
    

Cleveland's next game was against the Yankees, who had the best record in the AAFC's eastern division and were a likely opponent in the championship game. New York took an early lead as Spec Sanders scored two rushing touchdowns in the first quarter and added a third in the second. Sanders, called "Spectacular Spec" by New York sportswriters, was having a career season. By the end of the year, he had compiled 1,432 rushing yards and 1,442 passing yards; his 18 touchdowns set a professional football record that was not surpassed until the 1960s. After Sanders' three touchdowns, New York's Buddy Young added a fourth in the second quarter, widening the Yankees' lead to 28–0. Cleveland's Bill Boedeker scored a touchdown on a pass from Graham at the end of the period, but the game appeared out of reach for Cleveland at the half. The Browns, however, came back in the second half. Motley rushed for two touchdowns in the third quarter and Jim Dewar ran for a score in the fourth. The game ended in a tie. At halftime, Yankees players had hurled insults at the Browns. "They got us upset, got us angry," Graham later said. "Finally we got mad as a team and we said, 'We'll show these guys,' and we started playing football." More than 70,000 fans came to watch the game, a record for a New York pro football game that stood until 1958. Attendance was boosted by the presence of about 25,000 black fans who came in part to watch the four black players in the game: Buddy Young of the Yankees and Motley, Bill Willis and Horace Gillom of the Browns. Groza was injured during the game and was not able to play.

Week 13: vs. Los Angeles Dons

Source: Pro Football Reference
    
    
    
    
    
    
    

Cleveland next faced the Dons in Los Angeles. The Dons, who had handed the Browns their only loss of the season in October, scored a field goal and touchdown in the first quarter. The Browns responded with a touchdown run from Motley later in the quarter and led by four points at halftime after Tommy Colella caught a pass from Graham for another touchdown in the second period. Cleveland built on the lead in the third quarter with a long touchdown pass to Lew Mayne. Speedie sealed the victory for the Browns when he intercepted a backward lateral pass by Dons quarterback Chuck Fenenbock and ran it back 12 yards for a touchdown with four minutes left in the game. Los Angeles threatened to score numerous times, but Cleveland's defense held. The Browns forced the Dons to punt three times from within their own 10-yard line. Graham had 240 yards of passing. His two touchdown passes added to his league-leading total of 22 on the season. Tackle Lou Saban continued to handle placekicking duties for the Browns as Groza sat out with an injury.

Week 14: vs. Baltimore Colts

Source: Pro Football Reference
    
    
    
    
    
    

Cleveland's final regular-season game was a shutout victory over the Baltimore Colts. The Browns amassed 559 passing and rushing yards against the Colts, winning 42–0 and ending the season with a 12–1–1 record. Graham threw for three touchdowns, boosting his season total to 25, and raised his total passing yards to 2,752. Backup quarterback Cliff Lewis threw another touchdown in the third quarter as Graham and most of the other starters were pulled from the game. Groza returned to the lineup after sitting out several weeks because of an injury. He kicked all four of the Browns' extra points and played a bigger role than usual as an offensive and defensive tackle because of an injury to Ernie Blandin in the second quarter. Cleveland's defense held Baltimore to 186 yards of total offense. The Yankees beat the Bills 35–13 the same week as Sanders scored three touchdowns. New York ended with an 11–2–1 record, winning the eastern division and a spot in the championship game against the Browns.

Final standings

AAFC championship game

Source: Pro Football Reference
    
    
    

For the second year in a row, the Cleveland Browns and the New York Yankees faced off in the AAFC championship game, this time on a cold December day at Yankee Stadium. The crowd of 61,879 was the largest ever to watch a professional football championship game. The Browns and Yankees had played to a 28–28 tie the previous month, but the championship game did not feature much scoring because of an icy field. The Browns scored a touchdown in the first quarter on a short run by Graham set up by a 51-yard run up the middle of the field by Motley. New York scored a field goal in the second quarter, but Jones ran for another touchdown in the third, and the Browns won 14–3. The slippery field made longer passes dangerous, and Graham instead relied on shorter routes, ending the game with 14 completions and 112 passing yards. Motley was a key performer for the Browns, running for 109 yards on 13 carries, including his touchdown. The Browns' defense, meanwhile, kept Spec Sanders and New York's offense in check. New York had just 13 first downs in the game and 212 total yards. A stop by the defense in the second quarter as the Yankees reached the Browns' five-yard line forced New York to kick its lone field goal. Tommy Colella added an interception in the third quarter to stop another New York drive. Sanders had just 40 yards of rushing on 12 attempts and 89 yards of passing. Gillom's booming punts – his five kicks averaged 45 yards – also helped the Browns stop New York's dangerous return game. The Yankees had a 4.7-yard punt return average.

Season leaders and awards

Graham led the AAFC in passing and was voted the league's most valuable player. Pro Football Illustrated named Brown the AAFC coach of the year. Speedie and Lavelli were the AAFC's top two receivers in receptions and receiving yards. Colella tied for the AAFC lead with six interceptions on the year. Motley was the AAFC's third-leading rusher, with 889 yards, and Gillom came in second in punting average, with 44.6 yards. Speedie, Lou Rymkus, Graham and Motley were chosen unanimously by sportswriters for an all-AAFC team. Lavelli and Bill Willis were also selected by some of the writers. Graham and Speedie were named first-team selections when the Associated Press put together a combined AAFC and NFL All-Pro list.

Cleveland's success drew large crowds both at home and away in 1947. The team's average home attendance was 55,848 people during the season, slightly lower than in 1946 but still the best in either the AAFC or NFL. Including away games, a total of 666,017 people saw the Browns play, a professional football record. Although the team was a major success on the field, the following season was even better for Cleveland. The team won all of its games in 1948 and a third straight AAFC championship.

References

Bibliography

External links 
 1947 Cleveland Browns at Pro-Football-Reference.com
 1947 Cleveland Browns Statistics at jt-sw.com
 1947 Cleveland Browns Schedule at jt-sw.com
 1947 Cleveland Browns at Database Football

Cleveland
Cleveland Browns seasons
1947 in sports in Ohio